Arabshah (also Romanized as '‘Arabshāh; also known as ‘Arabābād and ‘Arabshā) is a village in Padena-ye Vosta Rural District, Padena District, Semirom County, Isfahan Province, Iran. At the 2006 census, its population was 102, in 28 families.

References 

Populated places in Semirom County